The 2001 Blue Eagle/Thai Airways Thailand Masters was a professional ranking snooker tournament that took place between 11 and 17 March 2001 at the Merchant Court Hotel in Bangkok, Thailand.

Ken Doherty won in the final 9–3 against Stephen Hendry. The defending champion, Mark Williams, was defeated by John Parrott in the last 16.


Main draw

Final

References

2001 in snooker